Taipei City Constituency VII includes all of Xinyi and part of Songshan in central Taipei. The district was created in 2008, when all local constituencies of the Legislative Yuan were reorganized to become single-member districts.

Current district
 Xinyi
 Songshan: 2 sub-districts
 Zhonglun: 9 urban villages
 Zhongzheng, Jiren, Dunhua, Fuyuan, Fucheng, Zhonglun, Meiren, Fujian, Fushi
 Beizhen: 4 urban villages
 Xinju, Jixiang, Ciyou, Fusheng

Legislators

Election results

References 

Constituencies in Taipei